HD 88218 (HR 3992) is a binary star in the southern constellation Antlia. The system has a combined apparent magnitude of 6.14, making it faintly visible to the naked eye.

The visible component has a stellar classification of G0 V, indicating the object's status as a solar analogue. The system has an orbital period of 86.6 years.

References

External links
 Image HD 88218

Antlia
088218
G-type main-sequence stars
3992
High-proper-motion stars
049769
CD-35 06194
0379.1
Binary stars
Antliae, 49